The Fisher Culex and Culite are a family of American two-seat, twin-engined monoplanes. The aircraft is supplied in the form of blueprints for amateur construction, originally by Fisher Flying Products and now by Mike Fisher Aircraft.

Development
Both designs are mid-wing monoplanes, constructed predominantly from wood, with tandem seating for two, with  fixed conventional landing gear. Empty weights for finished aircraft are typically . The designer indicates that the inspiration for the design was the Second World War deHavilland Mosquito bomber.

Variants
Culex
Twin engine, mid-wing monoplane powered by two  Limbach 2000 four-stroke piston engines.
Culite
Twin engine, mid-wing monoplane powered by two  Rotax 503 two-stroke piston engines.

Specifications (typical Culex)

References

Notes

Bibliography

External links

1990s United States civil utility aircraft
Homebuilt aircraft
Mid-wing aircraft
Twin-engined tractor aircraft